(The) Man Without a Name may refer to:
 Man Without a Name (1976 film), a Hungarian drama film
 Man Without a Name (1932 film), a German drama film
 The Man Without a Name (1943 film), a French drama film
 Peter Voss, Thief of Millions (1921 film) or The Man Without a Name, a German silent adventure film